The Kuban barbel (Barbus kubanicus) is a species of ray-finned fish in the  family Cyprinidae. It is found in the Kuban River to the Sea of Azov.

References 

Barbus
Freshwater fish of Europe
Fish described in 1912